Albert Menduni (born 18 September 1945) is a French boxer. He competed in the men's light middleweight event at the 1968 Summer Olympics.

References

1945 births
Living people
French male boxers
Olympic boxers of France
Boxers at the 1968 Summer Olympics
Sportspeople from Grenoble
Light-middleweight boxers